Newbury Park High School, founded in 1967, is a co-educational public high school located in Newbury Park, California.

Academics

The school is one of two International Baccalaureate schools in Ventura County, the other being Rio Mesa High School.

In 2006, NPHS underwent a technological overhaul including the addition of new computers and the introduction of Zangle.  Implemented at the beginning of the 2006-2007 academic year, Zangle is an online system by Aequitas Solutions for teachers to input and submit grading online, as well as allowing parents to access their child's attendance and grade information. In 2013, Zangle changed its name to "Q", but still performed the same tasks as before.

A second technological overhaul began in the 2015-2016 school year. This included boosted funding for the Panther TV student broadcast program, new Lenovo desktop computers with faster Intel cores and smaller frames, and purchase of charging station carts with Chromebooks or traditional laptops for every department. The school internet system was also revised to be faster, more bring-your-own-device friendly (in terms of ease of Wi-Fi connection), and better security blocks.

NPHS has a technology academy on campus known as the Digital Arts and Technology Academy, or "DATA." This program is for sophomores, juniors and seniors who are selected by faculty to join. The students are enrolled in English, Social Science, Science, and a Technology class together.

Athletics
Newbury Park's athletic teams are known as the Panthers, and the school colors are black and gold.  The following sports are offered:

Baseball (boys)
Basketball (girls & boys)
Cross country (girls & boys) 
Fencing Club (one of the longest surviving clubs on campus). 
Football (boys)
Golf (girls & boys)
Lacrosse (girls & boys)
Softball (girls)
Soccer (girls & boys)
Stunt (girls & boys)
Swimming (girls & boys)
Tennis (girls & boys)
Track & field (girls & boys)
Volleyball (girls & boys)
Water polo (girls & boys)
Wrestling (girls & boys)

Major Championships
Baseball CIF Champion 1968
Swimming CIF Champion 1979
Football CIF Champions 1993
Women's Basketball CIF Champion and Southern California State Champions 1995
Baseball CIF Champion 2012
Dance Team National Grand Champions 2012, USA National Sweepstakes Champions 2015
Boys Cross Country Division II CIF 2018 State Champion
Girls Cross Country DIvision II CIF 2019 State Champion
Boys Cross Country Division II CIF 2019 State Champion
Boys NXN Nike Cross Nationals 2019 Champion
Boys Cross Country Division I CIF 2021 State Champions
Boys Cross Country 2021 Garmin RunningLane National Champions 
 Boys Cross Country Division II CIF 2022 State Champion
Boys NXN Nike Cross Nationals 2022 Champion

Notable alumni
 Jordan Cameron, football player in the NFL
 Colby Cameron, football player in the NFL
 Belinda Carlisle, singer
 Hailey Clauson, Sports Illustrated swimsuit model
 Lorna Doom, born Teresa Ryan, bass guitarist in The Germs
 Heather Locklear, actress
 M. Ward, musician, producer
 Katie Meyer, college soccer player
 Jason Narvy, actor
 Jesse James Rutherford, singer
 Jimmie Sherfy, pitcher for Arizona Diamondbacks
 Will Svitek, football player in the NFL
 Kim Woo-sung, singer in The Rose
 Shirley Wu, award-winning data scientist
 Nico Young, long-distance runner who competed in the 2020 Olympic Trials

References

External links
 Newbury Park High School Website

Conejo Valley Unified School District
High schools in Ventura County, California
Newbury Park, California
Public high schools in California
International Baccalaureate schools in California
1967 establishments in California
Educational institutions established in 1967
School buildings completed in 1967
Buildings and structures in Thousand Oaks, California